Mohamed Gaber (born 25 October 1946) is an Egyptian wrestler. He competed in the men's Greco-Roman 68 kg at the 1972 Summer Olympics.

References

1946 births
Living people
Egyptian male sport wrestlers
Olympic wrestlers of Egypt
Wrestlers at the 1972 Summer Olympics
Place of birth missing (living people)
20th-century Egyptian people